The 1936–37 Scottish Second Division was won by Ayr United who, along with second placed Morton, were promoted to the First Division. Edinburgh City finished bottom.

Table

References

Scottish Football Archive

Scottish Division Two seasons
2
Scot